The Lassio River is a river of Gabon.  It is one of the tributaries of the Ogooué.

References
 Lerique Jacques. 1983. Hydrographie-Hydrologie. in Geographie et Cartographie du Gabon, Atlas Illustré led by The Ministère de l'Education Nationale de la Republique Gabonaise. Pg 14–15. Paris, France: Edicef.
 Perusset André. 1983. Oro-Hydrographie (Le Relief) in Geographie et Cartographie du Gabon, Atlas Illustré led by The Ministère de l'Education Nationale de la Republique Gabonaise. Pg 10–13. Paris, France: Edicef.

Rivers of Gabon